Phelps Hospital, part of the Northwell Health system, is a general hospital located in Sleepy Hollow, New York. , the hospital comprises 238 beds on its  campus. It was founded in the 1950s to accommodate the need for a hospital larger than the pre-existing Tarrytown Hospital.

References 

Hospitals in Westchester County, New York